Kristoffur Jakobsen (born 7 November 1988) is a Faroese footballer who plays for ÍF Fuglafjørður in the Faroe Islands Premier League. He has one cap for the Faroe Islands and he had previously played at junior level for his country.

Club career
Following the completion of the 2013 season Jakobsen signed for ÍF Fuglafjørður.

International career
Kristoffur made his debut for the Faroe Islands in the friendly match against Iceland, in 2008.
He hasn't made any official appearances since and was last called up to the squad in February 2012 as a late call-up for a training camp held in Spain.

References

External links
 Kristoffur Jakobsen's profile on FaroeSoccer.com
 EB-Streymur.fo, Official Website of EB/Streymur.

1988 births
Living people
Faroese footballers
Faroe Islands international footballers
EB/Streymur players
KÍ Klaksvík players
Faroe Islands under-21 international footballers
Association football midfielders
Faroe Islands youth international footballers
Association football forwards